The Kruitmolen (English: Powder mill, Limburgish: Polfermeule) is a watermill located on the Plenkertstraat 82 in Valkenburg aan de Geul, Netherlands. Build in 1820 along the Geul river, the watermill functioned as powder mill until 1851 and temporarily became a paper mill  between 1875 and 1884. Since 1887 it is part of a brewery where it currently still forms a part of the electrical supply system. 

The mill is a rijksmonument since January 24, 1984 and is part of the Top 100 Dutch heritage sites.

References

External links 
 Kruitmolen on database of mills
 Kruitmolen on molen.nl

Watermills in the Netherlands
Watermills in Limburg (Netherlands)
Rijksmonuments in Valkenburg aan de Geul